NA-19 Swabi-I is a constituency for the National Assembly of Pakistan. The constituency was formerly known as NA-12 (Swabi-I) from 1977 to 2018. The name changed to NA-18 (Swabi-I) after the delimitation in 2018 and to NA-19 (Swabi-I) after the delimitation in 2022.

Members of Parliament

1977–2002: NA-12 Swabi-I

2002–2018: NA-12 Swabi-I

2018-2023: NA-18 Swabi-I

Elections since 2002

2002 general election

A total of 2,009 votes were rejected.

2008 general election

A total of 3,041 votes were rejected.

2013 general election

A total of 4,094 votes were rejected.

2018 general election 

General elections were held on 25 July 2018.

†Change from combined vote of JUI-F, JI, and MDM in 2013

2023 By-election 
A by-election will be held on 16 March 2023 due to the resignation of Asad Qaiser, the previous MNA from this seat.

See also
NA-18 Haripur
NA-20 Swabi-II

References

External links 
 Election result's official website

18
18